Malu, Nepal  is a 4th ward of Tamakoshi Rural Municipalities  in Dolakha District in the 3 no. Province of north-eastern Nepal. At the time of the 1991 Nepal census it had a population of 2,439 people living in 497 individual households.

References

External links
UN map of the municipalities of Dolakha District

Populated places in Dolakha District